Fourplay (stylized as fOURPLAY) is a contemporary American smooth jazz quartet. The original members of the group were Bob James (keyboards), Lee Ritenour (guitars), Nathan East (bass), and Harvey Mason (drums).

In 1997, Lee Ritenour left the group and Fourplay chose Larry Carlton as his replacement. In 2010, Larry Carlton left Fourplay and was replaced by Chuck Loeb, who died on July 31, 2017. During Loeb's illness, saxophonist Kirk Whalum joined the group for performances.

The group has enjoyed consistent artistic and commercial success by grafting elements of R&B and pop to jazz, appealing to a broad mainstream audience. Their debut album, Fourplay (1991), sold over a million copies and remained at the number one position on the Billboard contemporary jazz chart for 33 weeks. Their next album, Between the Sheets (1993), reached number one, went gold, and received a Grammy Award nomination. In 1995, their third gold album, Elixir, also reached the number one position and remained on the chart for more than 90 weeks. In 2015 the band celebrated its 25th anniversary with the release of the album Silver with former members Ritenour and Carlton.

Discography

DVD-Video 
 An Evening of Fourplay Volumes I and II (1994)
 Live in Cape Town (2005)
 Live at San Javier Jazz Festival (2006)

References

External links 
 

American jazz ensembles
Smooth jazz ensembles
Warner Records artists
Bluebird Records artists
Musical groups established in 1991
1991 establishments in the United States